Sha Sha Liu (also known as Liu Shasha) is a female Chinese professional pool player. She is one of the most successful 9-Ball world champions of all time, having won the Women's WPA World Nine-ball Championship on three occasions, in 2009, 2014 and 2015. In 2009, Sha Sha became the youngest women's player ever to win the WPA Women's World Nine-ball Championship at 16 years old.

Titles
 2015 WPA Women's World Nine-ball Championship
 2014 WPA Women's World Nine-ball Championship
 2014 WPA World Team Championship
 2013 China Open 9-Ball Championship
 2009 WPA Women's World Nine-ball Championship

References

External links

Female pool players
Chinese pool players
1990s births
Living people
Asian Games medalists in cue sports
Cue sports players at the 2010 Asian Games
Asian Games gold medalists for China
Medalists at the 2010 Asian Games